Mystery White Boy is a live album by American singer-songwriter Jeff Buckley released in 2000 (see 2000 in music). This is a compilation of live recordings that Buckley's mother Mary Guibert compiled from DAT recordings of his supporting tour for Buckley's album Grace. Also known as  Mystery White Boy: Live '95–'96, the album earned mixed to positive critical views and was also a commercial success in the artist's native U.S., hitting #12 on the Top Internet Albums chart released by Billboard.

Track listing

Charts

Certifications

References 

Jeff Buckley albums
Live albums published posthumously
2000 live albums
Columbia Records live albums